Vasylivka (formerly Oleksandrivka (Олександрівка), also known as Shkadivka (Шкадівка)) is a village on the Kinburn Peninsula in Mykolaiv Raion (district) of Mykolaiv Oblast in southern Ukraine that is located at about  south-southwest (SSW) of the centre of Mykolaiv city. It belongs to Ochakiv urban hromada, one of the hromadas of Ukraine.

Until 18 July 2020, Vasylivka belonged to Ochakiv Raion. In July 2020, as part of the administrative reform of Ukraine, which reduced the number of raions of Mykolaiv Oblast to four, Ochakiv Raion was merged into Mykolaiv Raion.

During the Russian invasion of Ukraine, 2022
The village came under attack and was occupied by Russian forces during the Russian invasion of Ukraine in 2022. The village, as well as all other occupied territory in the Mykolaiv Oblast, was illegally annexed by Russia as part of their Kherson Oblast.

Following a Russian withdrawal and a counter offensive by Ukrainian forces between November 9 and 11, almost all other settlements in the Mykolaiv Oblast were liberated from Russian control. The exceptions being Vasylivka, as well as the other settlements on the Kinburn Peninsula, namely Pokrovske and Pokrovka.

References

External links

Villages in Mykolaiv Raion, Mykolaiv Oblast